Roșu (Romanian, meaning "red") may refer to:

Places
 Roșu, a village in Răducăneni commune, Iași County, Romania 
 Roșu, a village in Chiajna commune, Ilfov County, Romania
 Roșu, a village administered by the city of Vatra Dornei, Suceava County, Romania
 Roșu, Cahul, a commune in Cahul district, Moldova

People with the surname
Alexandru Roșu (born 1987), Romanian weightlifter
Constantin Roșu (born 1990), Romanian footballer 
Iulian Roșu (born 1994), Romanian footballer 
Laurențiu Roșu (born 1975), Romanian footballer 
Monica Roșu (born 1987), Romanian gymnast
Neluț Roșu (born 1993), Romanian footballer 
Pelaghia Roșu (1800–1870), Romanian revolutionary

See also 
 Lacul Roșu, a lake in Harghita County, Romania
 Pârâul Roșu (disambiguation)
 
 Roșia (disambiguation)
 Roșieni (disambiguation)
 Roșiori (disambiguation)
 Roșioara (disambiguation)

Surnames from nicknames